Big Brother 6 is the sixth season of various versions of Big Brother and may refer to:

Big Brother 2006 (Netherlands), the 2006 Dutch edition of Big Brother
Gran Hermano Spain (Season 6), the 2004 edition of the reality television series Big Brother (Gran Hermano Spain)
Big Brother 2005 (UK), the 2005 edition of the UK reality television series Big Brother
Big Brother 6 (U.S.), the 2005 edition of the US reality television series Big Brother
Big Brother Germany (Season 6), the 2005-2006 German edition of Big Brother
Big Brother Australia 2006, the 2006 edition of the reality television series Big Brother Australia
Big Brother Brasil 6, the 2006 Brazilian edition of Big Brother
Grande Fratello Season 6, the 2006 edition of the reality television series Big Brother in Italy
Big Brother 2010 (Finland), the 2010 edition of Big Brother in Finland
Gran Hermano Argentina (Season 6), the 2010-2011 Argentinian edition of Big Brother
Big Brother Africa (season 6), the 2011 edition of Big Brother in Africa
Secret Story 2012 (France), the 2012 edition of Big Brother in France
Big Brother 2012 (Sweden), the 2012 Swedish edition of Big Brother
Bigg Boss (season 6), the 2012-2013 edition of Big Brother in India
Big Brother 6 (Albania), the 2013 Albanian edition of Big Brother
Big Brother 6 (Denmark), the 2014 Danish edition of Big Brother

See also
 Big Brother (franchise)
 Big Brother (disambiguation)